The 2005 Trofeo Nazionale C.S.A.I. Formula 3000 Italia was contested over 8 rounds. 9 different teams and 26 different drivers competed. In this one-make formula all drivers had to utilize Lola chassis (Lola B02/50) and Zytek engines. This season also saw a Light Class running older Lola chassis (Lola B99/50) and Zytek engines. In the Light Class 11 different drivers competed, but only one of them for the whole season.

Driver and Team Lineup

Main Class

Light Class

Calendar
All races were held in Italy, excluding round at Brno in Czech Republic.

Results

Final points standings

Driver

Main championship
For every race points were awarded: 10 points to the winner, 8 for runner-up, 6 for third place, 5 for fourth place, winding down to 1 point for 8th place. Additional points were awarded to the pole winner (1 point) and to the driver leading the most laps (1 point). Light Class drivers were also able to score points in the main class.

Light Class championship

Points system see above.

Teams

Main

Light

References

External links
Official Euroseries 3000 site

Formula 3000
Auto GP
Italian Formula 3000